Creatine kinase (CK), also known as creatine phosphokinase (CPK) or phosphocreatine kinase, is an enzyme expressed by various tissues and cell types. CK catalyses the conversion of creatine and uses adenosine triphosphate (ATP) to create phosphocreatine (PCr) and adenosine diphosphate (ADP). This CK enzyme reaction is reversible and thus ATP can be generated from PCr and ADP.

In tissues and cells that consume ATP rapidly, especially skeletal muscle, but also brain, photoreceptor cells of the retina, hair cells of the inner ear, spermatozoa and smooth muscle, PCr serves as an energy reservoir for the rapid buffering and regeneration of ATP in situ, as well as for intracellular energy transport by the PCr shuttle or circuit. Thus creatine kinase is an important enzyme in such tissues.

Clinically, creatine kinase is assayed in blood tests as a marker of damage of CK-rich tissue such as in myocardial infarction (heart attack), rhabdomyolysis (severe muscle breakdown), muscular dystrophy, autoimmune myositides, and acute kidney injury.

Types
In the cells, the cytosolic CK enzymes consist of two subunits, which can be either B (brain type) or M (muscle type). There are, therefore, three different isoenzymes: CK-MM, CK-BB and CK-MB. The genes for these subunits are located on different chromosomes: B on 14q32 and M on 19q13. In addition to those three cytosolic CK isoforms, there are two mitochondrial creatine kinase isoenzymes, the ubiquitous form and the sarcomeric form. The functional entity of the mitochondrial CK isoforms is an octamer consisting of four dimers each.

While mitochondrial creatine kinase is directly involved in the formation of phosphocreatine from mitochondrial ATP, cytosolic CK regenerates ATP from ADP, using PCr. This happens at intracellular sites where ATP is used in the cell, with CK acting as an in situ ATP regenerator.

Isoenzyme patterns differ in tissues. Skeletal muscle expresses CK-MM (98%) and low levels of CK-MB (1%). The myocardium (heart muscle), in contrast, expresses CK-MM at 70% and CK-MB at 25–30%. CK-BB is predominantly expressed in brain and smooth muscle, including vascular and uterine tissue.

Atomic structure

The first atomic structure of a creatine kinase proper, solved by X-ray protein crystallography, was that of the octameric, sarcomeric muscle-type mitochondrial CK (s-mtCK) in 1996., followed by the structure of ubiquitous mitochondrial CK (u-mtCK) in 2000. Both mt-CK isoforms form octameric structures (built of 4 banana-like dimers) with a four-fold symmetry and a central channel.
The atomic structure of the banana-shaped, dimeric cytosolic brain-type BB-CK was solved in 1999 at a resolution of 1,4 Å. Cytosolic BB-CK, as well as muscle-type MM-CK both form banana-shaped symmetric dimers, with one catalytic active site in each subunit.

Functions
Mitochondrial creatine kinase (CKm) is present in the mitochondrial intermembrane space, where it regenerates phosphocreatine (PCr) from mitochondrially generated ATP and creatine (Cr) imported from the cytosol. Apart from the two mitochondrial CK isoenzyme forms, that is, ubiquitous mtCK (present in non-muscle tissues) and sarcomeric mtCK (present in sarcomeric muscle), there are three cytosolic CK isoforms present in the cytosol, depending on the tissue. Whereas MM-CK is expressed in sarcomeric muscle, that is, skeletal and cardiac muscle, MB-CK is expressed in cardiac muscle, and BB-CK is expressed in smooth muscle and in most non-muscle tissues.

Mitochondrial mtCK and cytosolic CK are connected in a so-called PCr/Cr-shuttle or circuit. PCr generated by mtCK in mitochondria is shuttled to cytosolic CK that is coupled to ATP-dependent processes, e.g. ATPases, such as acto-myosin ATPase and calcium ATPase involved in muscle contraction, and sodium/potassium ATPase involved in sodium retention in the kidney. The bound cytosolic CK accepts the PCr shuttled through the cell and uses ADP to regenerate ATP, which can then be used as an energy source by the ATPases (CK is associated intimately with the ATPases, forming a functionally coupled microcompartment). PCr is not only an energy buffer, but also a cellular transport form of energy between subcellular sites of energy (ATP) production (mitochondria and glycolysis) and those of energy utilization (ATPases).

Thus, CK enhances skeletal, cardiac, and smooth muscle contractility, and is involved in the generation of blood pressure. Further, the ADP-scavenging action of creatine kinase has been implicated in bleeding disorders: persons with highly elevated plasma CK could be prone to major bleeding.

Laboratory testing

CK is often determined routinely in a medical laboratory. It used to be determined specifically in patients with chest pain, but this test has been replaced by troponin. Normal values at rest are usually between 60 and 400 IU/L, where one unit is enzyme activity, more specifically the amount of enzyme that will catalyze 1 μmol of substrate per minute under specified conditions (temperature, pH, substrate concentrations and activators.) This test is not specific for the type of CK that is elevated.

Creatine kinase in the blood may be high in health and disease. Exercise increases the outflow of creatine kinase to the blood stream for up to a week, and this is the most common cause of high CK in blood. Furthermore, high CK in the blood may be related to high intracellular CK such as in persons of African descent.

Finally, high CK in the blood may be an indication of damage to CK-rich tissue, such as in rhabdomyolysis, myocardial infarction, myositis and myocarditis. This means creatine kinase in blood may be elevated in a wide range of clinical conditions including the use of medication such as statins; endocrine disorders such as hypothyroidism; and skeletal muscle diseases and disorders including malignant hyperthermia, and neuroleptic malignant syndrome.

Furthermore, the isoenzyme determination has in the past been used extensively as an indication for myocardial damage in heart attacks. Troponin measurement has largely replaced this in many hospitals, although some centers still rely on CK-MB.

See also 
 Reference ranges for blood tests
 CPK-MB test

References

External links 
 Simply stated at mdausa.org
 
 CPK isoenzymes test 
 CK at Lab Tests Online

Chemical pathology
EC 2.7.3